Alfonsów may refer to the following places:
Alfonsów, Łask County in Łódź Voivodeship (central Poland)
Alfonsów, Opoczno County in Łódź Voivodeship (central Poland)
Alfonsów, Poddębice County in Łódź Voivodeship (central Poland)
Alfonsów, Masovian Voivodeship (east-central Poland)